Zakaria Mumuni (born 11 December 1996) is a Ghanaian football striker for Aduana Stars.

References

1996 births
Living people
Ghanaian footballers
Ghana international footballers
West African Football Academy players
Aduana Stars F.C. players
Association football forwards